Gol Mahalleh or Gel Mahalleh may refer to:
 Gol Mahalleh, Rudsar, Gilan Province
 Gol Mahalleh, Chaboksar, Rudsar County, Gilan Province
 Gol Mahalleh, Babol, Mazandaran Province
 Gel Mahalleh, Juybar, Mazandaran Province
 Gol Mahalleh, Mahmudabad, Mazandaran Province